Sandra the Fairytale Detective is an animated television series created by Myriam Ballesteros and produced by Imira Entertainment, Televisión Española and DQ Entertainment.

The series aired on Disney Channel all over the world as well as: TF1 in France, RTP in Portugal, e-Junior in the Emirates, TV9 in Malaysia, Toon Disney in Italy, Nickelodeon in different parts in Asia, TG4 in Ireland, Okto in Singapore, VTM Kids in Belgium, Hanoi TV in Vietnam, RSI in Switzerland, MBC 1 in Mauritius, RTVE, Clan, and Disney XD in Spain, Kids Talk Talk HD and Cartoon Network in South Korea, Kids Network, OSN Kidzone TV, and Al Sayyer in the Middle East, Canal Once in Mexico, Kidz TV in Turkey, Gloob in Brazil, DBC in Denmark, RTHK in Hong Kong, Arutz HaYeladim in Israel, 5 in the Philippines, M2 in Hungary, Pluto TV Kids in the United Kingdom and Qubo in the US. It was also available on video streaming services being shown on KidoodleTV in Canada and Kwese Iflix in Ghana.

Synopsis 
The series revolves around a young girl named Sandra who solves mysteries in the Fairytale World, with her friend Fo the elf, while avoiding interference from a bully named Marcus.

Characters 
 Sandra Ochiaperridi (voiced by Jules de Jongh) is a 7-year-old girl who is a fairy tale detective. She also takes notes from the victims.
 Fo the Elf (voiced by Dan Russell) is Sandra's partner, a 508-year-old elf with fairy wings. Whenever there is a case that needs to be solved, he takes Sandra to the fairy tale world by casting a magic spell.
 Raquel (voiced by Alex Bothwell) is Sandra's best friend. She wears pigtails and has blonde hair.
 Marcus is Sandra's rival. He is always bullying Sandra without a reason.

Fairy Tale Land 
 Snow White (voiced by Alex Bothwell)
 The Seven Dwarfs (voiced by Bob Saker)
 Hansel & Gretel
 Little Red Riding Hood
 Three Little Pigs
 Pinocchio
 Cinderella
 The Three Musketeers
 Vulture (voiced by Bob Saker)
 The Three Bears (voiced by Dan Russell, Alex Bothwell, and Jules De Jongh)
 Captain Blackbeard (voiced by Bob Saker)
 King Arthur Pendragon (voiced by Bob Saker)
 Morgana Le Fay (voiced by Alex Bothwell)
 Scolymus (voiced by Bob Saker)

Episodes

Season 1

References

External links
 Official website
 Sandra The Fairytale Detective in the Internet Movie Database

2000s Spanish television series
2000s animated television series
Portuguese children's animated fantasy television series
Portuguese children's animated mystery television series
Spanish children's animated fantasy television series
Spanish children's animated mystery television series
Spanish flash animated television series
Qubo
Disney XD original programming
RTVE shows
Animated television series about children